Jericho is an historic suburb of the English city of Oxford. It consists of the streets bounded by the Oxford Canal, Worcester College, Walton Street and Walton Well Road. Located outside the old city wall, it was originally a place for travellers to rest if they had reached the city after the gates had closed. The name Jericho may have been adopted to signify this 'remote place' outside the wall. As of February 2021, the population of Jericho and Osney wards was 6,995.

History

Originally an industrial area, Jericho grew because of its proximity to the Oxford Canal, which arrived in 1790. The Eagle Ironworks (now redeveloped into apartments), wharves and the Oxford University Press were based there and its residential streets are mostly 'two-up, two-down' Victorian workers' houses. With back streets of 19th century terraced housing and many restaurants, it has become a popular area for student and London commuter accommodation.

Reports from the 1870s suggest that early homes in Jericho were built with very poor drainage. Low-lying land and lack of basic drainage in these homes would result in flooding. Flooding, open sewers, and overcrowding resulted in deaths from diseases such as typhoid and dysentery, with five out of eleven typhoid deaths in 1873 originating from Jericho. Jericho residents also accounted for twenty two cases of cholera during the  1832 epidemic.

In the 1950s, Jericho was briefly a red light area, and in the early 1960s there were plans to demolish it and replace it with light industrial units and new housing. However, many people objected and campaigned to save this historic area, rallied by local city councillor Olive Gibbs and the Jericho Residents Association. As a result, the plans were changed. Houses beyond repair were demolished, but many others were upgraded in the late 1960s and early 1970s with the help of council grants. This encouraged many young professionals and families to move in; subsequently Jericho became one of Oxford's most sought-after areas. Large council and social housing developments were built in the 1970s and 1980s.

Community

Jericho retains a strong community spirit. The Jericho Community Association runs the Jericho Community Centre in Canal Street, maintains the community website, Jericho Online, and organises the annual Jericho Street Fair which is held in mid-June each year, around the feast day of the patron saint Barnabas (11 June). It is also the focus for other community activities and has also been very active in campaigning for responsible development of the canal-side land behind St Barnabas Church, on a part of which it plans to build a new Community Centre as one of the four members of the Jericho Wharf Trust.
Jericho is served by a primary school, St Barnabas Primary School, a large primary school where over 50% speak English as a second language.

Appropriately for its biblical name, Jericho is also known for its iconic places of worship. The Church of England parish church is the Anglo-Catholic St Barnabas Church, next to the Oxford Canal. St Sepulchre's Cemetery lies off Walton Street, which has no associated church and has lost its chapel. The Albert Street Chapel (Reformed Baptist) is also in the neighbourhood. The Oxford Synagogue (one of the few in England with more than one denomination of Judaism worshipping in the same house) and the Oxford Jewish Centre are in Jericho.

Castlemill Boatyard is a 160-year-old wharf on the canal in Jericho, previously owned by British Waterways and now closed. British Waterways sold the site to a company that subsequently went into administration. The land has been bought by a developer but has yet to be developed. The Jericho Wharf Trust has been negotiating with the developer to develop the site as a focus for community activities including a new boatyard and community centre. One member of the Jericho Wharf Trust is Jericho Community Boatyard Ltd which has been set up to restore services for Oxford boaters.

Next to the Castlemill Boatyard was the old ferry house and chain ferry which allowed access to the South Oxford Canal towpath and then on to Port Meadow and the banks of the River Thames by foot.  The ferry has now been replaced by a footbridge and the site is now the College Cruisers Wharf accessed via Combe Road off Canal Street.  It is a busy thriving hire boat base and working boatyard providing for the needs of local and visiting narrow boats.  The last and first service stop for essential services for boats before they cruise the River Thames or leave it.
 
The local cinema has seen a number of incarnations. It started in 1913 as the North Oxford Kinema. In 1925, it was renamed The Scala. In 1970 it was split in two and became Studios 1 and 2, one of which was well known for showing softcore pornography. In 1977, the cinema revived again after being taken over by the London company Contemporary Entertainments and acquired its current name, the Phoenix, showing first-run and art house films.

In 2015 a local coterie launched a campaign called 'Change Your Mind' which was aimed at changing people's minds about what it means to be part of North Oxford. They hoped to change people's opinion on the area and get rid of incorrect beliefs. They have also set up a support system for those interested in joining in their set up activities.

In 2017 Jericho was ranked number 11 in a list of the UK’s ‘most hip’ destinations. The ranking was compiled by TravelSupermarket, and took into account vegan cafes, independent bike shops, vinyl record stores and independent coffee shops. In 2018 the suburb dropped to number 20 on the list, although it scored full marks, for the second year running, in the ‘creative capital’ category, which concerned co-working and creative spaces.

In fiction

Thomas Hardy's novel Jude the Obscure has a scene set in St Barnabas Church and it is likely that the suburb named 'Beersheba' in the novel is based on Jericho. As an homage to Hardy, in 1996, one of Jericho's pubs was renamed Jude the Obscure.

The first episode of the long-running ITV drama series Inspector Morse, starring British actor John Thaw, called "The Dead of Jericho", was partially filmed in the streets of Jericho, notably Combe Road ('Canal Reach' in the drama). It also featured the exterior of the Bookbinders Arms public house on the corner of Victor Street. The spin-off show Lewis also has stories based around the same area.

Philip Pullman set parts of his novels Northern Lights and Lyra's Oxford in Jericho. In the books, Jericho is home to the water-dwelling "Gyptians". He has been a vocal advocate of the residential boaters' fight to save the Castlemill Boatyard.

In The Whore's Asylum by Katy Darby (Penguin Group, 2012), the "home for indigent whores" is in Victor Street and the young doctor attending their special medical needs lives in Canal Street. Jericho in 1887 is described (probably inaccurately) as "haunted by drunkards, thieves, and the lowest sort of brazen female as ever lifted her petticoats".

Gallery

See also
 Art Jericho, a contemporary art gallery
 Great Clarendon Street
 Juxon Street

References

Sources and further reading

External links

 Jericho Online
 The Oxford Guide: Jericho

Areas of Oxford
Culture in Oxford